Abo abo is a live album by Ukrainian rock band Vopli Vidopliassova and the band's first official release. It was released in 1992 and is taken from a concert at the Eurockéennes festival in France in 1991. The concert was recorded by an unknown Frenchman with a Maxell cassette and was given to the band.

Track list 

The vinyl version of Abo abo has the first 7 tracks plus the first 18 seconds of Rassvet on side A and the rest of Rassvet plus tracks 8 through 14 on side B.

Track 1 has never been officially released anywhere else. Tracks 2-5, 9, 11 and 12 were released on Kraina Mriy. Track 6 was released on Fayno. Tracks 10 and 13 were released on Hvyli Amura and tracks 7 and 14 were released on Buly denky. Track 8 later was recorded by Borshch as "Konforka" and released on their self-titled single "/bɔːʃ/" in 2002.

In 1993, the album was reissued on vinyl.

A gig with a similar setlist, performed in Bordeaux in 1991, was released on the bootleg cassette Zhittya v Bordo in 1995.

On the Australian iTunes Store, the name of the album is censored due to the word abo coincidentally being an ethnic slur in Australian English referring to Australian Aborigines. The Ukrainian word is pronounced  and the Australian one is pronounced  .

Personnel 
 Oleg Skripka - vocals, accordion, rhythm guitar
 Yuri Zdorenko - vocals, lead guitar
 Alexander Pipa - bass
 Sergei Sakhno - drums

External links 
 Abo abo on Discogs (list of versions)

1992 live albums
Vopli Vidopliassova albums